Yevgeny Ivanovich Saltsyn (born 26 February 1929) is an Azerbaijani water polo player who competed for the Soviet Union in the 1960 Summer Olympics. He was born in Crimea. In 1960, he was a member of the Soviet team, which won the silver medal in the Olympic water polo tournament. He played one match.

See also
 List of Olympic medalists in water polo (men)

External links
 

1929 births
Possibly living people
Ukrainian emigrants to Russia
Azerbaijani male water polo players
Russian male water polo players
Soviet male water polo players
Olympic water polo players of the Soviet Union
Water polo players at the 1960 Summer Olympics
Olympic silver medalists for the Soviet Union
Olympic medalists in water polo
People from Crimea
Medalists at the 1960 Summer Olympics